Joseph O'Connor (2 June 1904 – 8 January 1982) was an Irish water polo player. He competed in the men's tournament at the 1928 Summer Olympics.

References

1904 births
1982 deaths
Irish male water polo players
Olympic water polo players of Ireland
Water polo players at the 1928 Summer Olympics
Sportspeople from Derry (city)